Motor torpedo boat PT-617, also known as Big Red Cock and Dragon Lady, "is the sole surviving 80' Elco type PT boat and represents the United States's most heavily used, highly favored, and combat-tested PT boat type in World War II."  She is a museum ship at the PT Boat Museum in Fall River, Massachusetts.  The  Elco type boat was the predominant type and is the same type as the famous  commanded by John F. Kennedy;  the  "Higgins" boat is the other type.

PT-617 was declared a National Historic Landmark in 1989.

Design
PT-617 is a PT-103-class ELCO motor torpedo boat. The hull was constructed of two layers of mahogany planking laid diagonally over laminated spruce, white oak, and mahogany frames, reinforced with longitudinal battens, secondary transverse frames, and clamps. A layer of fabric, impregnated with marine glue, was laid between the two layers of planking.

There were also two depth charges mounted on racks on the stern, along with a smoke generator. Two Mark 50 rocket launchers and a  mortar were also installed. In addition the crew were issued with small arms, each man carrying a M1911.45 caliber pistol, and the boat carried a .30 caliber Browning Automatic Rifle, M1903 Springfield .30-06 bolt-action rifles, .45 caliber Thompson submachine guns, 3-inch rockets, and Mk 2 grenades.

Ship history
PT-617 was built by the Electric Launch Company of Bayonne, New Jersey. Laid down on 29 March 1945, and launched on 28 July, she was not completed until 21 September, after the end of the war. The boat was assigned to MTB Squadron 42 and slated for service with the Pacific Fleet, but this was later cancelled. The boat was placed out of service on 28 January 1946, and finally sold on 23 October 1947.

In private hands the boat served as a yacht, and as a salvage and as a diving platform. She was bought by PT Boats, Inc. in 1979, and after restoration to her World War II configuration officially went on display on 1 September 1985.

See also
National Register of Historic Places listings in Fall River, Massachusetts
List of National Historic Landmarks in Massachusetts
Motor torpedo boat PT-796
Motor torpedo boat PT-658

References

External links
  PT-617 web gallery

 

National Historic Landmarks in Massachusetts
Buildings and structures in Fall River, Massachusetts
617
1945 ships
Museum ships in Massachusetts
Ships on the National Register of Historic Places in Massachusetts
National Register of Historic Places in Fall River, Massachusetts
World War II on the National Register of Historic Places